Katorea (Cattleya) is the name of several fictional characters:

 Cattleya in Zero no Tsukaima (The Familiar of Zero)
 Cattleya in Queen's Blade
 Cattleya in Rave Master
 Cattleya in Pokémon, whose English name is Caitlin